Xigu District is one of 5 districts of the prefecture-level city of Lanzhou, the capital of Gansu Province, Northwest China. It is the westernmost part of the city of Lanzhou proper. Until 1952, Xigu was part of Gaolan County as a township and in 1953 it was established as the fifth district level division of Lanzhou. During this period, as part of China's first five-year plan, the petrochemical industry was developed in the area.

Administrative divisions
Subdistricts

Towns

Townships
 Jingou Township

Economy
Xigu District is highly industrialized, and most of Lanzhou's heavy industry is located in the district, including PetroChina's Lanzhou Petrochemical complex, an aluminium smelting plant, power plants, and textile industry. It was also the site of a nuclear enrichment factory, completed in 1958, which provided the material for China's first atomic bomb.

Transport
 China National Highway 109
 China National Highway 213
 G2201 Lanzhou Ring Expressway
 Lanzhou–Zhongchuan Airport intercity railway
 Lanzhou–Xinjiang railway
 Lanzhou Metro Line 1
 Dongchuan Railway Logistics Center, freight train land port with trains to destinations as far as Pakistan and Nepal.

References

See also
 List of administrative divisions of Gansu

Xigu District
Geography of Lanzhou